The 1991 Ireland rugby union tour of Namibia. The Ireland national rugby union team made their first and, to date, only visit to Namibia in 1991. Richard Wallace made his full international debut in the first test game. Ireland played four matches, winning twice against Namibia B but losing both capped matches with the Namibia national rugby union team. The tour has been dubbed one of the most embarrassing episodes in Irish rugby history.

Matches
Scores and results list Ireland's points tally first.

Touring party
  Tour Manager: K.E. Reid
  Team Manager: Ciaran Fitzgerald
  Assistant Manager: John Moloney
  Fitness Adviser: Eddie O'Sullivan
  Captain: Phillip Matthews

Backs

Forwards

References

See also

1991
1991 rugby union tours
1991
rugby union
1991–92 in Irish rugby union
1991 in African rugby union